Ophiusa dianaris is a moth of the family Erebidae. It is found in Africa, including Eswatini, Ethiopia, and South Africa.

References

External links 
 Museum National d'Histoire Naturelle: Holotype of Ophiusa dianaris

Ophiusa
Moths described in 1852
Moths of Africa
Moths of the Middle East